Tyler Sanders (2004–2022) was an American actor.

Tyler Sanders may also refer to:

 Tyler Sanders or TJ Sanders (born 1991), Canadian volleyball player
 Tyler Sanders, character in Furry Vengeance played by Matt Prokop